Samarium(III) oxide (Sm2O3) is a chemical compound. Samarium oxide readily forms on the surface of samarium metal under humid conditions or temperatures in excess of 150°C in dry air. Similar to rust on metallic iron, this oxide layer spalls off the surface of the metal, exposing more metal to continue the reaction. The oxide is commonly white to off yellow in color and is often encountered as a highly fine dust like powder.

Uses
Samarium(III) oxide is used in optical and infrared absorbing glass to absorb infrared radiation.  Also, it is used as a neutron absorber in control rods for nuclear power reactors.  The oxide catalyzes the dehydration and dehydrogenation of primary and secondary alcohols.  Another use involves preparation of other samarium salts.

Preparations
Samarium(III) oxide may be prepared by two methods:

1. thermal decomposition of samarium(III) carbonate, hydroxide, nitrate, oxalate or sulfate:
 Sm2(CO3)3 → Sm2O3 + 3 CO2

2. by burning the metal in air or oxygen at a temperature above 150 °C:
 4 Sm + 3 O2 → 2 Sm2O3

Reactions
Samarium(III) oxide dissolves in mineral acids, forming salts upon evaporation and crystallization:
 Sm2O3 + 6 HCl → 2 SmCl3 + 3 H2O

The oxide can be reduced to metallic samarium by heating with a reducing agent, such as hydrogen or carbon monoxide, at elevated temperatures.

References

Samarium compounds
Sesquioxides